Cultural Park station is an interchange station between Line 6 and Line 8 of the Guangzhou Metro. It is located underground in the Liwan District and started operation on 28December 2013.

Station layout

Exits

References

Railway stations in China opened in 2013
Guangzhou Metro stations in Liwan District